Caroline Wawzonek is a Canadian politician, who was elected to the Legislative Assembly of the Northwest Territories in the 2019 election. She represents the electoral district of Yellowknife South, and was elected to Premier Caroline Cochrane's cabinet by the new cohort of territorial MLAs on October 24, 2019.

References 

Living people
Members of the Legislative Assembly of the Northwest Territories
Women MLAs in the Northwest Territories
People from Yellowknife
21st-century Canadian politicians
21st-century Canadian women politicians
Year of birth missing (living people)